Soviet Marxism: A Critical Analysis is a 1958 book by the philosopher Herbert Marcuse, in which the author provides a critique of the Ideology of the Communist Party of the Soviet Union. It received positive reviews, describing it as a convincing discussion of its subject.

Summary

Marcuse sees domination in the Soviet Union as linked to the Soviet bureaucracy and new rationality of industrial societies. The individual is forced to submit to the machine process.

Marcuse also critiques the Soviet division between "DiaMat" and "HistoMat". Unlike the philosopher Karl Marx, the Soviets saw historical materialism as an application of dialectical materialism, rather than a single unity. He claims that the emphasis on the dialectic of nature de-emphasizes history.

Background and publication history
According to the philosopher Douglas Kellner, Soviet Marxism was based in part on Marcuse's work for the Office of Strategic Services (predecessor of the Central Intelligence Agency) and the State Department after 1945, and the classified intelligence report he wrote. The book was first published in the United States in 1958 by Columbia University Press, as part of the series Studies of the Russian Institute, and in the United Kingdom in 1958 by Routledge & Kegan Paul. In 1985, Columbia University Press reprinted the book with a new introduction by Kellner.

Reception
Soviet Marxism received positive reviews from the Catholic priest John Francis Cronin in the American Catholic Sociological Review and the historian Sidney Monas in the American Sociological Review. The book received a negative review from the professor of government Edward Taborsky in Southwestern Social Science Quarterly.

Cronin described the book as persuasive and challenging, and compared it to the work of Milovan Đilas.

Monas concluded that, "Marcuse brings the best insights of his masters (Hegel, Marx, Freud) to bear on his analysis of Soviet Marxism, and the result is a dense, eloquent, and convincing book, demonstrating that what these masters revealed of human possibilities is not about to be accomplished in the modern world." He noted that Marcuse's analysis of the Soviet Union differed from that of the Marxist writer Isaac Deutscher, and described his "rather bleak" conclusions as contrasting with his previous work Eros and Civilization (1955).

Taborsky argued that Marcuse was mistaken on several important matters related to Soviet communism and had adopted questionable conclusions, such as that faith in the rationality of Soviet indoctrination was "a decisive element in the popular strength of the Soviet regime", that Communist parties independent of the Soviet Union and perhaps even the Communist Party of the Soviet Union itself might develop into social democratic parties, and that it is difficult to find Soviet moral ideas that are not common to western ethics. He argued that these mistakes were the result of Marcuse's belief in the "over-riding rationality" of the Soviet system and similar biases and accused him of suggesting that the totalitarian nature of Soviet communism was caused by the "existence of a competitive Western society".

References

Bibliography
Books

 
 
 

Journals

  
  
 

1958 non-fiction books
Books about Marxism
Books about the Soviet Union
Columbia University Press books
English-language books
Sociology books
Works by Herbert Marcuse